Murroe Memorial Cross, also known as the Limerick Brigades Memorial, is an Irish War of Independence memorial located in the village of Murroe in County Limerick.

History 
This monument was carved by William Gaffney, a stonemason from County Waterford, who also carved the Irish cross at Lourdes.

The cross was unveiled by the Archbishop of Cashel, Dr Harty, on 27 May 1923. It was built to commemorate the men of the east Limerick and Mid Limerick brigades of the Irish Republican Army (IRA) who lost their lives in the War of Independence. Thousands of people from both County Limerick and County Tipperary attended the unveiling of the monument. In his speech (at the unveiling) the Archbishop said that this monument was not only a symbol of sacrifice and brotherhood but it was also a promise of resurrection.

Features 
This is a freestanding monument that comprises a limestone ashlar Celtic cross on a tapered base. The base is adorned with inscribed limestone plaques and the monument has a great amount of figurative as well as Celtic strap work detailing.It stands at the crossroads in the centre of the village on a high mound. It is 250cm in height and the width at the base is 90cm.

The plaques at the base of the cross are inscribed with both Irish script and English text. The text on one plaque reads:"Greater love than this no man hath

that a man lay down his life for his friend"

Erected by a grateful people to the memory of

Brigadier Sean Wall

Adjutant Patrick Ryan

Lieutenant John Frahill

Soldiers of the Irish Republican Army

East Limerick and Mid Limerick Brigades

and other noble dead who fell in

1920 and 1921 fighting English aggression

They sought not honour praise renown

They loved and died tis the martyr's crown

May the Lord have mercy of their souls.On the opposite plaque, this same text is written in Irish or Gaelic script. The names of the other men from the Limerick brigades that died are inscribed on the remaining two plaques.

References 

Monuments and memorials in the Republic of Ireland
Buildings and structures in County Limerick
Irish Republican Army memorials